Sofiero Palace or just Sofiero in Helsingborg Municipality, Scania was one of the Swedish royal family's country mansions, located  north of Helsingborg. It was originally a Scanian farm called Skabelycke, bought in 1864 by Prince Oscar of Sweden and his wife Sophia of Nassau.  The first one-story palace was completed in 1865. It was expanded to its current size between 1874 and 1876, after Prince Oscar had been crowned King Oscar II of Sweden and Norway.

History 

In 1905, Oscar II's grandson Prince Gustaf Adolf, future King Gustaf VI Adolf, and his wife, crown princess Margaret received the palace as a wedding gift. They renovated the palace and started the large Rhododendron garden for which the palace is known today. Prince Gustaf Adolf become king in 1950 and until 1973 Sofiero was his and his second wife Lady Louise Mountbatten's official summer residence. It was supposedly the King's favorite place and upon his death, which occurred in Helsingborg, he left Sofiero to the city of Helsingborg so that the general public could enjoy it as much as he had.

Today 

A bus connection leaves several times an hour during peak hours from Helsingborg. The main attraction today is the very large gardens with a wide range of local (and other) plant life, stretching to the shore of Öresund. The Rhododendrons are especially noteworthy, consisting of almost 500 different varieties.  The park also holds a small collection of modern art.

During the summer the large grass areas are sometimes used  for large outdoor concerts with national as well as international stars such as Bob Dylan, Bryan Adams, James Brown and Norah Jones.

The former royal palace itself is today used as restaurant, cafe and at times as a gallery.

A brand of beer owned by Kopparbergs Brewery is named "Sofiero".

See also 
 Helsingborg

References

External links
 Sofiero - official site

Helsingborg
Castles in Skåne County
Gardens in Sweden
Tourist attractions in Skåne County
Museums in Skåne County
Historic house museums in Sweden
Royal residences in Sweden
19th-century establishments in Skåne County